Adolpho Ducke (October 19, 1876 – January 5, 1959), (also referred to as Adolfo Ducke and occasionally misspelled "Duque"), was a notable entomologist, botanist and ethnographer specializing in Amazonia.  According to family records, he was an ethnic German with roots in Trieste Austro-Hungary (now in Italy). German was his first language; that is, the German commonly spoken in Trieste in the 19th century. Most of his books were written in German.

Recruited by Emílio Goeldi, Ducke began his work in Amazônia as an entomologist for the Museu Paraense Emílio Goeldi, but due to the influence of botanists Jacques Hüber and Paul Le Cointe, he switched to botany. He traveled throughout Amazônia to study the complicated tree system of the rainforest. He published 180 articles and monographs, primarily on the Leguminosae, and he described 900 species and 50 new genera.  In 1918, while continuing his work for the Paraense Museum, he collaborated with the Rio de Janeiro Botanical Garden and the Instituto Agronômico do Norte. In the first half of the 20th century, he became one of the most respected authorities on the Amazonian flora. In 1954, his concerns about the future of the Amazonian forest led him to make a suggestion to the National Institute of Amazonian Research (INPA) for the creation of a nature reserve. He died in Fortaleza in 1959 before witnessing the fulfillment of his dream: In 1963, the Reserva Florestal Adolpho Ducke was established and named in his honour. Also named in his honour is a botanical garden east of Manaus, and the phytochemical research laboratory at the museum in Belém.

Ducke's entomological material is currently located at the Museu Paraense Emílio Goeldi in Belém, the Natural History Museum of Bern, the Museu de Zoologia of the University of São Paulo, and The Natural History Museum, in London. Ducke's general classification of the Neotropical social wasps is still used. Additionally, Ducke is known for his findings on the species Melipona subnitida, a species which he discovered and did significant field research on.

Honours
Adolpho Ducke has been honoured in the naming of several genera of plants including; Duckea (in 1958 ), Duckeanthus (in 1934 ), Duckeella (in 1939  ), Duckeodendron (in 1925 ) and Duckesia (in 1961 ).

Entomological publications 
 Ducke, A. (1897).  Ent. Nachr., 23, 38-43.
 Ducke, A. (1898).  Ent. Nachr., 24, 212-217, 257-262.
 Ducke, A. (1899).  Ent. Nachr., 25, 211-215.
 Ducke, A. (1900).  Ber. Ver., 25, 1-323.
 Ducke, A. (1901).  Zeitschr. Syst. Hymenopterol. Dipterol., 1, 353-361.
 Ducke, A. (1901).  Zeitschr. Syst. Hymenopterol. Dipterol., 1, 25-32, 49-67.
 Ducke, A. (1901).  Zeitschr. Syst. Hymenopterol. Dipterol., 1, 241-242.
 Ducke, A. (1902).  Bol. Mus. Paraense Emilio Goeldi, 3, 561-577.
 Ducke, A. (1902).  Allg. Zeitschr. Entomol., 7, 321-325, 360-368, 400-404, 417-421.
 Ducke, A. (1902).  Zool. Jb. Abt. Syst. Geogr. Biol. Tiere, 17, 285-328.
 Ducke, A. (1902).  Zeitschr. Syst. Hymenopterol. Dipterol., 2, 91-93.
 Ducke, A. (1902).  Zeitschr. Syst. Hymenopterol. Dipterol., 2, 102-103.
 Ducke, A. (1902).  Zeitschr. Syst. Hymenopterol. Dipterol., 2, 141-144.
 Ducke, A. (1902).  Verhandl. Zool. Bot. Ges., 52, 575-580.
 Ducke, A. (1902).  Zeitschr. Syst. Hymenopterol. Dipterol., 2, 204-207.
 Ducke, A. (1902).  Zeitschr. Syst. Hymenopterol. Dipterol., 3, 97-104.
 Ducke, A. (1903).  Zeitschr. Syst. Hymenopterol. Dipterol., 3, 176-177.
 Ducke, A. (1903).  Allgem. Zeitschr. Ent., 8, 368-372.
 Ducke, A. (1903).  Allg. Zeit. Entomol., 8, 368.
 Ducke, A. (1903).  Verhandlungen der kaiserlich-königlichen Zoologisch-Botanischen Gesellschaft in Wien, 53, 265-270.
 Ducke, A. (1903).  Zeitschr. Syst. Hymenopterol. Dipterol., 3, 129-136, 226-232.
 Ducke, A. (1904).  Zeitschr. Syst. Hymenopterol. Dipterol., 4, 209-214.
 Ducke, A. (1904).  Zeitschr. Syst. Hymenopterol. Dipterol., 4, 189-190.
 Ducke, A. (1904).  Boll. Soc. Ent. Ital., 36, 13-48.
 Ducke, A. (1904).  Bol. Mus. Emílio Goeldi, 4, 317-371.
 Ducke, A. (1904).  Zeitschr. Syst. Hymenopterol. Dipterol., 4(3), 134-143.
 Ducke, A. (1904).  Zeitschr. Syst. Hymenopterol. Dipterol., 4, 91-98.
 Ducke, A. (1905).  Zeitschr. wiss. Insektenbiol., 10/11, 175-177, 117-121.
 Ducke, A. (1905).  Rev. Ent., 24, 1-24.
 Ducke, A. (1905).  Bol. Mus. Emílio Goeldi, 4, 652-698.
 Ducke, A. (1905).  Boll. Soc. Ent. Ital., 36, 99-109.
 Ducke, A. (1905).  Zeitschr. Syst. Hymenopterol. Dipterol., 5, 227-229.
 Ducke, A. (1906).  Boll. Soc. Ent. Ital., 38, 3-19.
 Ducke, A. (1906).  Zeitschr. Syst. Hymenopterol. Dipterol., 6, 394-400.
 Ducke, A. (1906).  Zeitschr. wiss. Insektenbiol., 2, 17-21.
 Ducke, A. (1906).  Rev. Ent., 25, 5-11.
 Ducke, A. (1906).  Bull. Soc. Ent. Fr., 1906, 163-166.
 Ducke, A. (1906).  Zeitschr. Syst. Hymenopterol. Dipterol., 2, 51-60.
 Ducke, A. (1906).  (Second suppl.). Boll. Soc. Ent. Ital., 38, 3-19.
 Ducke, A. (1907 (1908)).  Rev. Ent., 26, 73-96.
 Ducke, A. (1907).  Zeitschr. Syst. Hymenopterol. Dipterol., 7, 80, 321-325, 361-368, 455-461.
 Ducke, A. (1907).  Rev. Ent., 26, 5-9.
 Ducke, A. (1907).  Rev. Ent., 26, 145-148.
 Ducke, A. (1907).  Ann. Soc. Ent. Fr., 76, 28-30.
 Ducke, A. (1907).  Bol. Mus. Paraense Emílio Goeldi, 5, 152-199.
 Ducke, A. (1907).  Zeitschr. Syst. Hymenopterol. Dipterol., 7, 137-141.
 Ducke, A. (1908).  Dt. ent. Zeitschr., 1908, 695-700.
 Ducke, A. (1908).  II. Hyménoptères récoltés dans l'Etat de Ceará en 1908. Rev. Ent., 27, 57-87.
 Ducke, A. (1908).  Rev. Ent., 27, 28-55.
 Ducke, A. (1908).  Zeitschr. Syst. Hymenopterol. Dipterol., 8, 44-47, 99-104.
 Ducke, A. (1909 (1911)).  Boll. Soc. Ent. Ital., 41, 89-115.
 Ducke, A. (1909).  Ann. Hist. Nat. Mus. Nat. Hungarici, 7, 626-627.
 Ducke, A. (1909).  Bull. Soc. Ent. Fr., 18, 306-309.
 Ducke, A. (1909).  Boll. Soc. Ent. Ital., 41, 89-115.
 Ducke, A. (1910).  Rev. Ent., 29, 78-122.
 Ducke, A. (1910).  Rev. Ent., 29, 73-77.
 Ducke, A. (1910).  Rev. Trimestral do Instituto do Ceará, 24, 3-61.
 Ducke, A. (1910).  Ann. Mus. Nat. Hungarici, 8, 449-544.
 Ducke, A. (1910).  Rev. Ent., 29, 180-192.
 Ducke, A. (1910).  Deutsch. Ent. Zeitschr., 1910, 362-369.
 Ducke, A. (1912).  Zool. Jb. Abt. Syst. Geogr. Biol. Tiere, 34, 51-116.
 Ducke, A. (1913).  Catálogos da Fauna Brazileira, Museu Paulista, 4, 1-31.
 Ducke, A. (1913).  Rev. Mus. Paulista, 5, 107-122.
 Ducke, A. (1913).  Deutsch. Ent. Zeitschr., 1913, 330-333.
 Ducke, A. (1914).  Zool. Jb. Abt. Syst. Geogr. Biol. Tiere, 36, 303-330.
 Ducke, A. (1916).  Commissão de Linhas Telegráficas Estratégicas de Matto Grosso ao Amazonas, 35 (anexo 5), 1-175.
 Ducke, A. (1918).  Rev. Mus. Paulista, 10, 314-374.
 Ducke, A. (1925).  Zool. Jb. Abt. Syst. Geogr. Biol. Tiere, 49, 335-448.

Botanical publications 

 Ducke, A. (1910). Explorações botânicas e entomológicas no Estado do Ceará. Rev. Trimestral do Instituto do Ceará, 24, 3-61.

References

Other sources
 Egler, W. A. (1963). Adolpho Ducke-traços biográficos, viagens e trabalhos. Boletim do Museu Emílio Goeldi. Nova série. Botânica, 18, 1-129.
 Overal, W. L. (1978). Designação de lectótipos de onze espécies de vespas sociais descritas por Adolpho Ducke, e notas sobre a coleção Ducke (Hymenoptera: Vespidae). Bol. Mus. Paraense Emílio Goeldi, n.s., Zool., 94, 1-14.
 Nascimento, P. T. R., & Overal, W. L. (1979). Contribuições entomológicas de Adolpho Ducke: taxônomia e bibliográfia. Bol. Mus. Paraense Emílio Goeldi, n.s., Zool., 95, 1-22.
 Overal, W. L. (1979). The collection of Adolph Ducke. Sphecos, 1, 17-19.
 Overal, W. L., & Nascimento, P. T. R. (1979). Contribuições entomológicas de Adolpho Ducke: Taxonomia e bibliografia. Bol. Mus. Paraense Emílio Goeldi, n.s., Zool., 95, 1-17.
 Carpenter, J. M. (1999). Taxonomic notes on paper wasps (Hymenoptera: Vespidae; Polistinae). ''American Museum Novitates(3259), 1-44.

External links
Botanist of the Brazilian Rainforest

1876 births
1959 deaths
Brazilian ethnographers
Hymenopterists
20th-century Brazilian botanists
Austro-Hungarian emigrants to Brazil
19th-century Brazilian botanists
Brazilian entomologists